Diospyros humilis, commonly named Queensland ebony, is a small eastern Australian tree found throughout Queensland and extending into Northern New South Wales and the Northern Territory. The plant is most commonly found in coastal and semi-arid zones in vine scrubs, brigalow woodlands and other locales with infrequent fire.

The plant grows as a small tree or shrub, with stiff, glossy, discolorous leaves. Fruit are oval and bright yellow, orange when ripe.

The timber is prized for woodturning and fine cabinet work.

References
 
 

humilis
Ericales of Australia
Flora of Queensland
Flora of New South Wales
Flora of the Northern Territory
Trees of Australia
Bushfood
Drought-tolerant trees